Benjamin Netanyahu served three times as Israel's Prime Minister from 1996–1999, 2009–2021, and from 2022 onwards. His fourth and fifth term as prime minister was overshadowed by ongoing investigation into alleged bribery, fraud and breach of trust by him and close political allies within his inner circle. The Israel Police began investigating Netanyahu starting in December 2016. As a result of their investigation, police recommended indictments against Netanyahu. Additionally, on 21 November 2019, Netanyahu was officially indicted for breach of trust, accepting bribes, and fraud. As a result of the indictment, Netanyahu is legally required to relinquish his ministry portfolios other than prime minister. Netanyahu's trial in the Jerusalem District Court began on 24 May 2020. Witness testimony began on 5 April 2021. As of May 31, 2022, the criminal trial is still ongoing. The prosecution sought to amend the Netanyahu's indictment in one of three cases against him, but it was rejected by the court. However, the court allowed the prosecution to add three new witnesses to Case 1000.

Overview
 Case 1000, officially opened in December 2016, involves valuable presents and gifts received by Netanyahu and his wife throughout the years from several wealthy acquaintances.
 Case 2000 deals with recorded conversations Netanyahu had with Arnon Mozes, chairman and editor of Yedioth Ahronoth, one of the largest newspapers in circulation in Israel. During these conversations, Netanyahu and Mozes discussed legislation that could harm Yedioth's major competitor, Israel Hayom.
 Case 4000 relates to telecommunications company Bezeq's relationship with its regulator, the communication ministry, at the time headed by Netanyahu.

On 21 November 2019, Netanyahu was officially charged with deception and breach of trust in cases 1000 and 2000, and with deception, breach of trust, and receiving bribes in case 4000.

Case 1000
In case 1000, Netanyahu has been charged with having had a conflict of interest when, in the capacity of Minister of Communications, he handled affairs related to the business interests of Arnon Milchan. The prosecution alleges that over the course of 20 years, Netanyahu received from Milchan, and from a friend of Milchan's, James Packer, expensive cigars and champagne, worth $195,000, and jewelry for Netanyahu's wife Sara costing $3,100. The charges cite three separate incidents in which Netanyahu assisted Milchan. In the first, Netanyahu contacted US officials regarding Milchan's visa to the US. In the second, in 2013, Netanyahu discussed with then-Finance Minister the possibility of extending the period of an investment tax break that would help Milchan (the tax break was not extended). In the third, Netanyahu directed an official of the communications ministry to provide information to Milchan regarding a merger of Milchan's telecommunication companies.

Case 2000
The two largest newspapers in circulation in Israel are Yedioth Ahronoth and Israel Hayom. Israel Hayom, which was owned directly and indirectly by Netanyahu's personal friend and benefactor Sheldon Adelson, is often criticized by the political left for portraying Netanyahu in an overly positive light. Conversely, Yedioth is often criticized by the right for being unfairly negative towards Netanyahu. "Israel Hayom" has an edge over other daily newspapers in Israel because it's distributed for free.

Netanyahu and the editor of Yedioth, Arnon "Noni" Mozes, held three meetings between 2008 and 2014, during which they discussed passage of legislation that would limit circulation of Israel Hayom in exchange for Yedioth hiring journalists more favorable to Netanyahu. The legislation received support from left-wing parties but failed due to opposition from Netanyahu's coalition, which Netanyahu says he dissolved due to his opposition to the legislation.

Netanyahu has been charged with fraud and breach of trust in the case; Mozes and two others were charged in November 2019 for attempted bribery. Adelson, who was primarily a resident of the United States of America, later died in January 2021.

Case 4000
Case 4000 involves the communication conglomerate Bezeq. The investigation reviewed, among other issues, whether falsehoods were made in regards to paperwork leading to favorable business dealings for Bezeq owner Shaul Elovitch in exchange for favorable reporting to Netanyahu by Walla!.

The Israeli Police recommended on 2 December 2018 that bribery charges be brought against Netanyahu and his wife. On 21 November 2019, Israeli Attorney General Avichai Mandelblit officially brought charges against Netanyahu of fraud, breach of trust, and receipt of bribes.

Protests

Several events have followed the investigations as they had widespread implications. As of September 2017, protesters have held Sunday rallies in Petah Tikva for 41 consecutive weeks to protest what they claim as interference with the investigations by the Attorney General Avichai Mandelblit.  Rallies have also been held in Tel Aviv's Rabin Square to protest government corruption, even in the midst of the COVID-19 crisis, where demonstrators stood the required two meters apart and wore masks.

Supporters of Netanyahu organized counter protests. In early August 2017, the leader of the coalition David Bitan began calling to arms the members of the Likud party, first in the form of the counter-protests in Petah Tikva, later by threatening any party member who won't stand behind Netanyahu of "getting even" in the next primary season, and finally in a large rally to show support. The rally was held in Tel Aviv and had a wide showing of the majority of the Knesset members from the Likud party. During the rally Netanyahu gave a controversial speech, accusing the media of being a part of a left-wing coalition and plotting against not only him but the entire right-wing. Opponents of Netanyahu argued that this was baseless, first because he is being investigated personally, as opposed to the entire Likud party, and because both Roni Alsheikh (Chief of the Israeli Police) and Attorney General Avichai Mandelblit were appointed by Netanyahu himself. Since then, Netanyahu has consistently attempted to denigrate the justice system and the police in an effort to discount the charges against him, culminating in a speech made outside the courtroom on 24 May 2020, before attending his first trial session. On October 25, 2022 ‘The Trial’ a documentary that disclosed troubling facts  about Benjamin Netanyahu’s trial was released. Hundreds of thousands of Israelis were exposed to exonerating evidence that was withheld from the defense, the use of spyware, illegal interrogations and what seemed like an orchestrated hunt after Netanyahu.

Indictment
On 19 December 2018, Israeli State Prosecutor Shai Nitzan recommended to Israeli Attorney General Avichai Mandelblit that Netanyahu be indicted. On 20 December 2018, Israeli Attorney General Avichai Mandelblit said he would "work quickly" on the case, but "not at the expense of quality decisions and professionalism".

On 28 February 2019, the Supreme Court of Israel rejected a motion filed by Netanyahu's Likud Party to stall the publication of the Attorney General's recommendations. The same day, Mandelblit announced that he had accepted police recommendations to indict Netanyahu on three of the charges and that the indictment will officially go into effect following a hearing.

The hearing took place in October 2019, and on 21 November, Netanyahu was indicted in cases 1000, 2000, and 4000 for charges including breach of trust, accepting bribes, and fraud.

As a result of the indictment, Netanyahu was legally required to relinquish of his ministry portfolios other than Prime Minister.

Immunity bid
Netanyahu submitted a request for immunity to the parliamentary speaker, Yuli Edelstein, on 1 January 2020. Many MKs, including Avigdor Lieberman of Yisrael Beiteinu, Benny Gantz of Blue and White, and Stav Shaffir of the Green Party, were critical of the move. Lieberman called for the Knesset to bring back committees that had been dissolved (and also indicated that his party would vote against a bid for immunity); without a Knesset committee, there would be no action on Netanyahu's immunity until after the March election. According to The Times of Israel columnist Raoul Wootliff, the election had in effect become a race to gain enough seats so that Netanyahu can successfully request immunity from over half of the MKs.

Knesset legal advisor Eyal Yinon ruled on 12 January 2020 that there was no impediment to forming a Knesset committee that could prevent Netanyahu from receiving immunity. If his immunity bid was not accepted, his trial could begin. There was a vote the next day establishing a House Committee that would debate immunity for Netanyahu; it was approved 16 votes in favour to five against. The committee included 30 members, with a majority from parties opposed to Netanyahu.

As a result, Netanyahu withdrew his bid for immunity on 28 January 2020; the charges against him were thus officially confirmed and filed in Jerusalem District Court on the same day.

Prelude to the trial
On 18 February 2020, the Justice Ministry announced that Netanyahu's trial would start in the Jerusalem District Court on 17 March 2020.

On 9 March 2020, Netanyahu filed a motion to delay the trial for 45 days. On 10 March, the court rejected this bid and affirmed the original trial date. However, on 15 March 2020, the beginning of the trial was pushed back until 24 May as a result of coronavirus-related restrictions. The Jerusalem District Court ordered Netanyahu to appear in person at the opening of his trial.

Trial
The trial began on 24 May 2020 in courtroom 317 of the Jerusalem District Court, in front of judges Rivka Friedman-Feldman, Moshe Bar-Am, and Oded Shaham, with Friedman-Feldman as the presiding judge. The prosecutors are Deputy State Attorney Liat Ben-Ari, who serves as lead prosecutor, Yonatan Tadmor, Deputy Chief of the Tel Aviv District State Attorney's Office Economic Crimes Division, and Yehudit Tirosh, Director of the Securities Department of the Israel Securities Authority. Netanyahu's defense team initially consisted of Amit Hadad, the chief of the defense team (with adv. Noa Milstein, Avichai Yehosef and Yair Leshem), and Micha Fettman. Fettman left the defense team following the first hearing and was replaced by Yossi Segev. Following the second hearing, Boaz Ben-Tzur joined the defense team.

Four preliminary hearings occurred in 2020. Netanyahu was present at the first hearing (an opening session called a "reading"), along with three other defendants in his corruption cases, Shaul Elovitch, Iris Elovitch, and Arnon Mozes. At the hearing, judges read out the charges to Netanyahu and the others, and the defendants confirmed that they understood them, after which the defense attorneys, prosecutors, and judges discussed the timing of the start of the evidentiary stage of the trial. The court exempted Netanyahu from appearing at subsequent preliminary hearings.

The second hearing on 19 July 2020 involved procedural issues to determine whether the prosecution and defense had examined the investigative materials and to determine the timing of the start of the evidentiary stage and number of hearings per week. Netanyahu's defense requested a delay due to the COVID-19 pandemic. The presiding judge, Rivka Friedman-Feldman, rejected the defense's request and ruled that the prosecution would begin presenting its case in January 2021, with witnesses to testify three times a week, and that Netanyahu would have to attend. On 26 July, the court announced that the trial's preliminary hearing would take place on 6 December, and Netanyahu would be obligated to attend. On 15 September, the prosecution summoned 90 witnesses to appear at the evidentiary phase of his trial. To accommodate the expected large number of audience members, a spacious courtroom (two regular courtrooms merged and remodeled) is being specially created for the trial. In late November 2020, the court delayed the beginning of the evidentiary stage, setting it for February 2021, with witness testimony to follow. 

In mid December 2020 the court ordered the prosecution to correct 50 clauses of the indictment due to essential flaws. In relation to the bribe clause, the state attorney was requested to add an addendum detailing all the press events related to the claim that Netanyahu requested more favorable coverage from the online Walla! news portal (the original bribe was defined as ‘positive press coverage’).
In the corrected indictment of case-4000, the bribery clause was modified to describe 'unusual responsiveness' as the bribe instead of positive press coverage, and the addendum added by the state attorney included 315 cases which were claimed to constitute the bribe.

Project 315's team members have took upon themselves to investigate the nature and content of 315 news publications stated in the indictment of the case-4000 trial.

In February 2021, the start of the evidentiary stage was again delayed to 5 April after the court accepted a request by Netanyahu's defense team to postpone it until the 2021 Israeli legislative election had taken place.

On 5 April 2021, the evidentiary stage of the trial began, with court proceedings taking place three times a week. After prosecutor Liat Ben-Ari delivered the opening statement for the prosecution, claiming that Netanyahu "abused his power to give illegal benefits in coordination with central media outlets to further his personal interests" and that the case was one of the gravest in Israel's history, the prosecution began presenting its case, starting with testimony from the first witness for the prosecution, former Walla CEO Ilan Yeshua, who stated, among other things, that Walla owner Shaul Elovitch ordered him to not report negative stories about Netanyahu and post stories favorable about him as well. On 12 April 2021, while testifying in the Jerusalem District Court, Yeshua testified that Netanyahu was the "big guy" and that he persuaded Walla to publish only edited parts of an interview he conducted with journalist Dov Gilhar so it would give him favor a week before the March 2021 Israeli election. According to Yeshua, "any negative item led to outburst" from Netanyahu. Yeshua also revealed a text message which Shaul sent to him in February 2015. In the text message, Shaul stated that he was having problems all day with Netanyahu, who he identified as "the big one." On 20 April 2021, Yeshua detailed multiple instances where Netanyahu was involved in setting editorial policy, such as telling Elovitch to take down a story which appeared on Walla! about a romantic relationship between Netanyahu's son and a non-Jewish Norwegian woman and requesting attacks on Naftali Bennett and his wife Gilat. During Yeshua's testimony, prosecutors also presented text messages from Elovitch in a WhatsApp group for senior Bezeq officials and recorded conversations between Shaul and Iris Elovitch as evidence to back up the testimony. Yeshua's testimony finished on 21 April, and the judges subsequently halted proceedings for a two-week period so as to enable Netanyahu's defense to make preparations to cross-examine Yeshua.

On 4 May 2021, the trial resumed. Netanyahu's attorneys began cross-examining Ilan Yeshua. During cross-examination, Yeshua stated, among other things, that Netanyahu got the website to remove stories about families of IDF soldiers who were killed in Gaza during the 2014 Gaza War. It was not clarified during cross-examination who it was who told the Walla editors to remove the stories about the "bereaved families," though Yeshua also claimed Netanyahu's wife Sara would make requests to Walla editors as well. He described Netanyahu associate Zeev Rubinstein as "their senior officer in the Byzantine court" and as someone who would pass on the "crazy requests and angles of Sara Netanyahu." The family of Hadar Goldin, an IDF soldier who was killed in combat and whose remains have been held by Hamas since 2014, also issued an angry response following Yeshua's testimony, stating that "For years we have been yelling about the institutional silence directed from above when it comes to returning Hadar Goldin. To what depths of the abyss can our leadership sink? Shame and disgrace."

In May 2022, during cross examination of the state’s key witness Shlomo Filber, the defence conclusively proved that the meeting between Filber and Netanyahu during which the prosecution claims that 'quid pro quo' instructions were supposedly given by Netanyahu could not have happened on the date alleged. The prosecution attempted to revise the indictment, but the court refused to allow this. Legal analysts concluded that the case suffered a severe blow, and that conviction in the bribery charge was less likely as a result.

Plea deal
Negotiations for the signing of a plea deal between Attorney General Avichai Mandelblit and Benjamin Netanyahu continued for several months before January 2022, and the talks are in a relatively advanced state as of January 15, 2022.
Netanyahu initiated the request for contacts, through one of his lawyers.
Opposition leader Netanyahu's condition for entering into a plea deal with the ombudsman was that the talks be held solely in front of him and without additional secret partners. This is because Netanyahu feared a leak that would present him as someone who is willing to admit to any offenses – something that actually happened with the leak of the talks.
The outline still being built in stages is reported as a result of a compromise between the two sides is:
There is no conviction for bribery, Netanyahu will plead guilty to two counts of fraud and breach of trust, the charge in the 2000 case will be dropped, will perform community service without a prison sentence, and the main dispute between the two sides is the question of defamation.

Aharon Barak, former president of the Supreme Court and leader of the constitutional revolution in the 1990s, which gave power to Israeli judicial activism, went public in support of the plea deal if it contained official defamation of Netanyahu, as a "public interest (according to him) in ending the rift in the Israeli people" by ending the trial.

The investigation into the affair of state gifts that remained with Netanyahu will continue to be investigated even if an agreement is signed. The Office of the Attorney General in the Office of the Prime Minister Naftali Bennett stated: "With regard to the gifts, the treatment of the Prime Minister's Office will continue."

See also
 Corruption in Israel

References

2020 in Israel
2021 in Israel
2022 in Israel
Bribery scandals
Political scandals in Israel
Benjamin Netanyahu